A gatekeeper's lodge or gate lodge is a small, often decorative building, situated at the entrance to the estate of a mansion or country house. Originally intended as the office and accommodation for a gatekeeper who was employed by the landowner to control access to the property, they fell out of use in the early 20th century but surviving examples are often preserved and can sometimes be used as domestic housing.

History

Originating from the gatehouses of medieval monasteries and manorhouses, gatekeeper's lodges became fashionable in the Georgian era along with landscape gardens. Initially these lodges were functional wooden buildings, intended to retain livestock and deter intruders, but during the 18th century, they developed into a visual statement, designed to give an initial impression of the landowner's wealth and taste. British architect John Buonarotti Papworth, wrote that park gates and their associated lodges should be:

Lodges were often designed to give a visitor a foretaste of the big house itself. Another British architect, Robert Lugar, advised:

Later in the 19th century, under the influence of Romanticism, lodges were sometimes built to resemble idealised country cottages. Gatekeeper's lodges were also built at the entrances to other enclosed spaces such as schools, parks and cemeteries.

The accommodation inside a lodge was generally rather small, sometimes consisting of only two rooms. The gatekeepers themselves were often retired servants, who besides being available to open the gates at any time, were required to keep the gateway and the surrounding grounds in order. Following the First World War, the huge number of staff required to run large houses and their grounds were no longer available and lodges began to be abandoned, even on those estates that escaped closure. However, lodges are now often preserved and larger examples can be converted into modern homes. A survey in Ireland completed in 2016 showed that of about 10,000 lodges identified from old maps, about forty percent had been demolished and a further thirty percent were in a ruinous state.

Gallery

References

House types